Vasily Frolov (born 1926) is a Soviet former sports shooter. He competed in the 25 m pistol event at the 1952 Summer Olympics.

References

External links
 

1926 births
Possibly living people
Soviet male sport shooters
Olympic shooters of the Soviet Union
Shooters at the 1952 Summer Olympics
Place of birth missing (living people)